Lester William "Buster" McCrabb (November 4, 1914 – October 8, 2008) was a starting pitcher who played in Major League Baseball. He batted and threw right-handed. The ,  McCrabb was born in Wakefield, Pennsylvania.

McCrabb's professional baseball playing career began in 1937 and lasted for a dozen seasons. He was obtained by the Philadelphia Athletics from the Wilkes-Barre team (Eastern) as part of a minor league working agreement. He reached the majors in 1939 with the Athletics, spending four consecutive years for them. In his only full season, he went 9–13 for the last-place 1941 A's with 11 complete games, one shutout (a seven-hit, three-strikeout whitewashing of the defending American League champion Detroit Tigers on July 27 at Shibe Park) and two saves. After an eight-year absence, including spending 1942–1947 in the minors, he returned with the club in 1950 for his last Major League appearance, then served the Athletics as a full-time coach from 1951–1954.

In a five-season American League career, McCrabb posted a 10–15 record with 57 strikeouts and a 5.96 ERA in 210 innings, including 13 complete games, one shutout, and one save. He surrendered 270 hits and 63 bases on balls.

At the time of his death, aged 93, McCrabb was recognized as one of the oldest living MLB players. He died October 8, 2008, survived by his wife Gladys Sprout McCrabb.

References

External links
Baseball Reference

1914 births
2008 deaths
Baseball players from Pennsylvania
Greenville Spinners players
Lancaster Red Roses players
Lexington Indians players
Major League Baseball pitchers
Montreal Royals players
Philadelphia Athletics coaches
Philadelphia Athletics players
Toronto Maple Leafs (International League) players
Tulsa Oilers (baseball) players
Williamsport Grays players